The 2nd Tournament for Bolesław Chrobry Crown - First King of Poland was the 2009 version of the Bolesław Chrobry Tournament. It took place on 23 May in the Start Gniezno Stadium in Gniezno, Poland. The draw was made on 15 May in the Gniezno' Old Square. The Tournament was won by Greg Hancock who beat Adrian Miedziński and Rune Holta. The top Gniezno' rider Krzysztof Słaboń was eighth.

Heat details 
 23 May 2009 (Saturday)
 Best Time:
 Attendance: 8,500
 Referee:
 Change: (7) Grzegorz Walasek (ZIE) → Rune Holta (GOR)

Heat after heat 
 Ułamek, Okoniewski, Dobrucki, Hancock
 Holta, Słaboń, Gollob, Jaguś
 A.Gomólski, Miedziński, Baliński, Jędrzejak
 Jabłoński, Skórnicki, Saifutdinov, Ljung
 Miedziński, Ljung, Dobrucki, Gollob
 Słaboń, Baliński, Jabłoński, Okoniewski
 Hancock, Saifutdinov, Holta, A.Gomólski
 Ułamek, Jaguś, Skórnicki, Jędrzejak
 Dobrucki, Skórnicki, A.Gomólski, Słaboń
 Saifutdinov, Gollob, Jędrzejak, Okoniewski
 Hancock, Jaguś, Jabłoński, K.Gomólski, Miedziński (t/-)
 Holta, Ułamek, Ljung, Baliński (X)
 Holta, Jędrzejak, Dobrucki, Jabłoński
 A.Gomólski, Ljung, Okoniewski, Jaguś
 Hancock, Skórnicki, Gollob, Baliński
 Miedziński, Słaboń, Ułamek, K.Gomólski
 Baliński, Dobrucki, Jaguś, K.Gomólski
 Miedziński, Holta, Skórnicki, Okoniewski
 Hancock, Jędrzejak, Ljung, Słaboń
 Ułamek, A.Gomólski, Jabłoński, Gollob (e2)
 The Final:
 Hancock, Miedziński, Holta, Ułamek

See also 
 motorcycle speedway
 2009 in sports

References

External links 
 (Polish) Official webside

Boleslaw Chrobry Tournament
Bolesław Chrobry Tournament